Čech (feminine Čechová) is a Czech surname meaning Czech. It was used to distinguish an inhabitant of Bohemia from Slovaks, Moravians and other ethnic groups. Notable people with the surname include:

 Dana Čechová (born 1983), Czech table tennis players
 Donovan Cech (born 1974), South African rower
 Eduard Čech (1893–1960), Czech mathematician
 Filip Čech (born 1980), Czech ice hockey player
 František Čech, Czech footballer
 František Ringo Čech (born 1943), Czech musician and politician
 Kateřina Čechová (born 1988), Czech athlete
 Ludwig Czech (1870–1942), Czech-German-Jewish political figure
 Marek Čech (disambiguation), multiple people
 Martin Čech (1976–2007), Czech ice hockey player
 Miya Cech (born 2004), American actress
 Olga Čechová (1925–2010), Czech printmaker
 Petr Čech (born 1982), Czech footballer
 Petr Čech (hurdler) (born 1944), Czech hurdler
 Svatopluk Čech (1846–1908), Czech writer, journalist and poet
 Thomas Cech (born 1947), American chemist
 Vladimír Čech (1951–2013), Czech actor, presenter and politician

See also
 Stone–Čech compactification, mathematical technique
 Čech cohomology, mathematical theory
 Největší Čech, Czech television series
 CECH, acronym for University of Cincinnati College of Education Criminal Justice and Human Services
 CECh, the Catholic Episcopal Conference of Chile

References

Czech-language surnames
Ethnonymic surnames